2nd Nizhnyaya Medveditsa or Vtoraya Nizhnyaya Medveditsa is a rural locality in Nizhnemedveditsky Selsoviet Rural Settlement, Kursky District, Kursk Oblast, Russia. Population:

Geography 
The village is located in the Bolshaya Kuritsa River basin (a right tributary of the Seym River), 96 km from the Russia–Ukraine border, 15 km north-west of Kursk, 0.5 km from the selsoviet center – Verkhnyaya Medveditsa.

 Climate
2nd Nizhnyaya Medveditsa has a warm-summer humid continental climate (Dfb in the Köppen climate classification).

Transport 
2nd Nizhnyaya Medveditsa is located on the federal route  Crimea Highway (a part of the European route ), 13.5 km from the nearest railway halt Bukreyevka (railway line Oryol – Kursk).

The rural locality is situated 18 km from Kursk Vostochny Airport, 138 km from Belgorod International Airport and 216 km from Voronezh Peter the Great Airport.

References

Notes

Sources

Rural localities in Kursky District, Kursk Oblast